June 1, 1974 is a live album of songs performed at the Rainbow Theatre in London on the titular date. The album is officially attributed to Kevin Ayers, John Cale, Brian Eno and Nico, although other well-known musicians, including Mike Oldfield, Robert Wyatt and Ollie Halsall, also contributed to the concert.

Content 
The cover photograph was taken by Mick Rock in the foyer of the Rainbow Theatre shortly before the concert began. The bemused stare between John Cale (right) and Kevin Ayers is said to be explained by the fact that Cale had caught Ayers sleeping with his wife the night before the show. The couple would divorce the next year.

Other songs that were performed but did not make the LP include Ayers' "I've Got a Hard-On for You Baby" (with Cale on backing vocals), Cale's "Buffalo Ballet" and "Gun", and Nico's "Janitor of Lunacy" and her rendition of "Das Lied der Deutschen".

Nico’s performance of "Das Lied der Deutschen" was released as a bonus track on the 2012 reissue of her 1974 album The End....

Critical reception 
Robert Christgau wrote of the record in Christgau's Record Guide: Rock Albums of the Seventies (1981):

Track listing

Personnel
 Kevin Ayers – vocals (B1-5), guitar (B1-5), bass guitar (A1-2)
 Brian Eno – vocals (A1-2), synthesizer (A1-4, B5)
 John Cale – vocals (A3), piano (A2), viola (A1, B5)
 Nico – vocals (A4), harmonium (A4)
 Mike Oldfield – lead guitar (B4), acoustic guitar (B5)
 Ollie Halsall – piano (A1), guitar (A2-3, B4), lead guitar (B1-3), acoustic guitar (B5)
 John "Rabbit" Bundrick – organ (A1-3, B1-5), organ, piano, electric piano (B1-3)
 Robert Wyatt – percussion (A1-3, B1-3 + 5)
 Doreen Chanter – backing vocals (A3)
 Archie Leggatt – bass guitar (A1-3, B1-3 + 5)
 Eddie Sparrow – drums (A2–3, B1-3), bass drum (A1), tympani (B5)
 Liza Strike – backing vocals (A3)
 Irene Chanter – backing vocals (A3)
Technical
 John Wood – engineer
 Phil Ault – assistant engineer
 Ray Doyle – assistant engineer
 Ian Tilbury – concert presenter
 Richard Williams – producer

References

External links 
 

Kevin Ayers albums
John Cale live albums
Brian Eno live albums
Nico albums
Collaborative albums
1974 live albums
Albums with cover art by Mick Rock
Island Records live albums